Nikolayevka is a rural locality (a selo) and the administrative center of Nikolayevsky Selsoviet of Nemetsky National District, Altai Krai, Russia. The population was 1077 as of 2016. There are 5 streets.

Geography 
Nikolayevka is located within the Kulunda Plain, 24 km west of Galbshtadt (the district's administrative centre) by road. Grishkovka is the nearest rural locality.

Ethnicity 
The village is inhabited by Russians, Germans and others.

References 

Rural localities in Nemetsky National District